The AAI In-Line was a prototype aircraft machine gun developed by AAI Corporation. The weapon was intended for potential aircraft use and capable of high rate of fire similar to the M134 Minigun but with the accuracy of a fixed barrel machine gun. The In-Line machine gun concept worked and passed air force tests but was not further developed. Around three of them were manufactured. The only known example is on display at the Air Force Armament Museum.

Design
The AAI In-Line is an externally driven chain/crankshaft operated machine gun with six fixed barrels. The belt feed is unusual as it uses a synchronizer for every sixth round is to be chambered in each barrel. It is chambered in 7.62×51mm NATO.

References

AAI In-Line
AAI In-Line at the Air Force Armament Museum

7.62 mm machine guns
7.62×51mm NATO firearms
Aircraft guns
Abandoned military projects of the United States
Multi-barrel machine guns